Raymunida insulata is a species of squat lobster in the family Munididae from the Pacific and Indian oceans. The species can be distinguished by its morphology (subtle morphological characteristics, such as length of the mesial spine on the basal antennal segment, the length of its walking legs, and color pattern) and its mitochondrial cytochrome c oxidase subunit I sequences.

References

Further reading

Lin, Chia-Wei, Tin-Yam Chan, and Ka Hou Chu. "A new squat lobster of the genus Raymunida (Decapoda: Galatheidae) from Taiwan." Journal of Crustacean Biology 24.1 (2004): 149-156.
Osawa, Masayuki. "The identity of Raymunida elegantissima (Crustacea: Decapoda: Anomura: Galatheidae) and description of a closely related new species from Japan." Species Diversity 10 (2005): 85-104.
Osawa, Masayuki, and Mohsen Safaie. "Two squat lobster species (Crustacea: Decapoda: Anomura) from the Persian Gulf, with description of a new species of Raymunida Macpherson & Machordom, 2000." Zootaxa 3861.3 (2014): 265-274.

External links

Squat lobsters
Crustaceans described in 2001